Tennant may refer to:
 
 Tennant (surname), people with the surname Tennant
 Tennant, California, a US census-designated place
 Tennant, Iowa, a US town
 Tennant Company, a floor cleaning company founded in Minneapolis, MN
 Tennants (auctioneers), a company in North Yorkshire, England

See also
 Tennant Creek (disambiguation), articles associated with the town in the Northern Territory of Australia
 Tenant (disambiguation)